is a passenger railway station located in Midori-ku, Yokohama, Kanagawa Prefecture, Japan, operated by the East Japan Railway Company (JR East).

Lines
Many services continue west of Higashi-Kanagawa via the Negishi Line to  during the offpeak, and to  during the morning peak. Rapid services do not stop at this station.

Station layout 
The station consists of a single island platform serving two elevated tracks with the station building underneath. The station is staffed.

Platforms

History 
Tōka'ichiba Station was opened on 1 March 1979 as a station on the Japanese National Railways (JNR).  With the privatization of the JNR on 1 April 1987, the station came under the operational control of JR East.

Station numbering was introduced on 20 August 2016 with Tōka'ichiba being assigned station number JH20.

Passenger statistics
In fiscal 2019, the station was used by an average of 20,598 passengers daily (boarding passengers only).

The passenger figures (boarding passengers only) for previous years are as shown below.

Bus transfers
Yokohama City Transit
Tokyū Bus
Kanagawa Central Transit

Surrounding area
Yokohama City Midori Ward Public Library branch
Daiei supermarket
Bus Terminal
Bank of Yokohama
Mediapolis (used books, movies and video games)
Super Autobucks
Sotetsu Rosen
Doutor Coffee
MOS Burger
McDonald's

See also
 List of railway stations in Japan

References

External links

 

Railway stations in Kanagawa Prefecture
Railway stations in Japan opened in 1979
Railway stations in Yokohama
Yokohama Line